O Dia em que a Terra Parou is the fifth solo studio album by the Brazilian musician Raul Seixas. It was released in 1977 by the newly founded record label WEA. The song 'Que luz é essa' became popular on TikTok along with the caption "me as a baby".

Track listing

1977 albums
Raul Seixas albums